Kerry Waghorn (born January 10, 1947) is a syndicated caricaturist whose Faces in the News feature, established in 1977 by Chronicle Features (San Francisco Chronicle) is a journalistic legend. He estimates that more than 9,000 of his images have been published since the early 1970s, including just about every prominent news, business and entertainment face over that span of history. During the many years he spent under the management of newspaper icon G. Stanleigh Arnold, the Chronicles Sunday and Features Editor, he refined his skills within a team that included Garry Trudeau (Doonesbury), Gary Larson (The Far Side), Abigail Van Buren (Dear Abby), William Hamilton (of The New Yorker), Phil Frank (Farley), and Cathy Guisewite (Cathy). Arnold had also been instrumental in the early stages of Charles Schulz' (Peanuts) career. Waghorn, who resides in West Vancouver, B.C., is currently represented by Universal Press Syndicate of Kansas City, MO, and he continues to create about three new caricatures a week. Universal, a subsidiary of Jim Andrews and John McMeel's Andrews McMeel Universal, founded in 1970, purchased Chronicle Features in 1997.

Biography and background 

Kerry was born and raised in North Vancouver, British Columbia, the son of Raymond and Morah Waghorn. His father, also born in British Columbia, was a coppersmith in the vibrant shipbuilding industry of North Vancouver. His mother, born in Louisbourg, N.S. on Canada's east coast, moved at a young age with her family to British Columbia. Kerry has one younger brother, Dean.

Kerry graduated from North Vancouver High School in 1965 and soon after attended the recently opened Simon Fraser University in nearby Burnaby, intending to study political science. He immediately became involved with the student newspaper The Peak as an editorial artist and layout editor. When SFU became a Canadian focal point of student and teacher protests, including the occupation of the administration buildings, Kerry's news career became so dominant he lost all interest in academic pursuits. The leap from the student press to underground newspapers and, subsequently, mainstream media became a logical progression.

During the student days his preoccupations included playing the drums in a succession of rock bands and also working on fishing boats along the B.C. coast. Yet everything he did came back to art: sketches of fishing boats, captains and crew; and drawings of rock musicians in multiple poses and situations.

It was the latter work that attracted the attention of the rock promoters of the late 1960s. Kerry's first commission was a poster advertising an upcoming concert by vocalist Laura Nyro. He was invited into a partnership with poster artist Bob Masse and moved into Masse's studio in Vancouver's Gastown. Posters for concerts of Led Zeppelin, Elton John, the Beach Boys, Boz Scaggs, Chicago, Grand Funk, Canned Heat, Doobie Brothers. Taj Mahal and many others followed.

During this era, The Georgia Straight, a trend-setting and controversial flagship of the underground press (still going strong in 2022), began publishing his cartoons. The Straight syndicated his work to a number of alternative newspapers, including the Los Angeles Free Press, the Detroit Free Press and The Berkeley Barb. Mainstream media would soon follow.

Newspapers and syndication 

From these first public roots at SFU's Peak, the rock posters and The Straight, he eventually graduated to the city's largest daily, The Vancouver Sun, as a regular contributor. One day he walked uninvited into the offices of The Sun and asked to see the newspaper's nationally recognized editorial cartoonist, Roy Peterson. Peterson was a welcoming host, critically reviewing Kerry's portfolio.

His work for The Sun would rapidly elevate his craft into the mainstream, learning as fast as he could from two masters, Peterson, and the equally famous local icon, Len Norris. Peterson was an accomplished news and political cartoonist, but Norris had a different gift. Len Norris was the pulse of a nation, beloved by all. His characters were every man, and every woman, frequently sitting in their kitchen and living room making poignant and sometimes hilarious comments about the world around them.

Visiting San Francisco in 1971 with his partner in the production of rock music posters, Kerry decided to pop into The Chronicle unannounced, hoping to show his art portfolio to cartoonist Robert Graysmith, who later achieved fame as the author of the book and subsequent motion picture about the Zodiac murders. The receptionist advised that Mr. Graysmith was not in but, after Kerry explained who he was and what he did, she asked if he would like to meet the Sunday Features Editor? Somewhat overwhelmed by his good fortune, Kerry was escorted in to meet Stan Arnold. This was the chance meeting that would change Kerry's life. Arnold, who died in 1997, would become Kerry's mentor, manager, car pool partner, best friend and fishing buddy.

Shortly after that fortuitous first meeting, Kerry began a life of two cities, migrating back and forth between Vancouver and San Francisco, and contributing to both daily newspapers, among other clients.
  
But San Francisco was indisputably big time and Chronicle Features, under Arnold and Stuart Dodds (principal marketing executive when Kerry began and Arnold's successor as editor) had become one of the most formidable syndication services in the newspaper world. Eventually, Kerry Waghorn moved to San Francisco, where he lived for 10 of the happiest years of his life.

Gradually, something else began to evolve within his work. Out of his art and cartoon creations, a unique gift began to dominate, and that was his talent for caricature, seeming to be able to drag the depths of a subject's soul and personality, into the visible plane. Chronicle Features launched Faces in the News by Kerry Waghorn in 1977. "I felt truly gifted during that era - with Stan Arnold's guidance and Stuart Dodds' incredible salesmanship, my work started appearing all over the world," Kerry remembers.

He pays tribute to David Levine of The New York Review of Books as a personal inspiration. Following Levine's death at the end of 2009, Kerry Waghorn issued this statement: "In caricature to me he was simply the greatest and still, to this day, it brings me a great deal of pleasure to look at his work."

A Universal subsidiary website (www.ucomics.com) characterized Kerry's work as follows:

"The image is worth a thousand words, and no one can put it like Kerry Waghorn. His caricatures are topical, highly detailed and skilfully drawn. The personality of his subject is always reflected in his illustration. He not only captures features, he captures character. From political figures to sports figures to corporate bigwigs, no face is safe from the scrutiny of Waghorn's pen. He uses his illustrations to satirize his subjects."

Waghorn today 

Today, Kerry enjoys the most extensive caricature service in the world. Waghorn's caricatures appear as a daily feature in many countries. His drawings have been published in more than 700 major newspapers and magazines world-wide, representing about 60 nations. Among the journals that have published his creations are the Miami Herald, Boston Globe, Chicago Tribune, The New York Times, New York Daily News, Atlanta Journal, Montreal Gazette, Japan Times, Sydney Morning Herald, Hamilton Bermuda Business, Korea Times and New Zealand Herald.

Included among the more familiar personalities who have acquired their original caricature by Waghorn are Tom Selleck, Chevy Chase, Michael Ovitz, Bryan Adams, Billy Joel, Bruce Willis, David Bowie, Michael Eisner, Malcolm Forbes, Greg Norman, Chris Evert, Michael Jackson and numerous U.S. and world political leaders.

One of his sideline projects during 2005 and 2006 was illustrating a book, a comprehensive expose of Canada's health management, titled Squandering Billions. This required frequent meetings with journalist/author Gary Bannerman and co-author Dr. Don Nixdorf, a noted Canadian health professional.

Kerry's parents and a brother, who all are in good health, live in North Vancouver, B.C., where his studio is located. He remained a bachelor until 2009. A few years ago - following an encounter arranged by a mutual friend - Kerry rekindled a relationship with Amber Campbell, an interior designer, who had been his prime romantic interest during school years. Amber and Kerry were married in April 2009 and now reside on the waterfront in West Vancouver, overlooking English Bay.

Kerry has little time for hobbies, but enjoys dominoes and fishing for the big Pacific Coast salmon. Among his most memorable adventures since returning from San Francisco have been long boat trips up the coast as far as Alaska with his friend, songwriter and recording star Terry Jacks ("Seasons in the Sun", The Poppy Family et al.), an environmentalist and passionate outdoorsman.

Awards 

Distinguished Citizen Award - North Vancouver, B.C. (1991)

Books 

 Writing in the Rain (Harbour Publishing, 1990)  (by Harold White, cover and illustrations by Kerry Waghorn).
 Squandering Billions (Hancock House, 2005)  (with Gary Bannerman and Dr. Don Nixdorf) - a brutally frank indictment of health spending.  www.squanderingbillions.net

Articles 

 Desbarats, Peter and Moser, Terry; The Hecklers; McLelland and Stewart, National Film Board of Canada; Toronto, 1979
 The North Shore News, North Vancouver, B.C.; Evelyn Jacobs; August 19, 1992; "Waghorn accepts fame with modesty."
 Vancouver Magazine, Vancouver B.C.; March 1993; "Drawing the Lines" 
 West Vancouver Lifestyle, West Vancouver, B.C.; Greg Potter; March, 1995; "The Pen and the Ink."
 The Vancouver Sun, Vancouver, B.C.; Oct. 4, 1997; John Mackie; "Brushed by Fame"
 Office@Home, Vancouver, B.C.; Winter 2002; Dave Strapps; "Kerry Waghorn Illustrated"

References

External links 
 

1947 births
Album-cover and concert-poster artists
Artists from British Columbia
Canadian editorial cartoonists
Canadian illustrators
Canadian caricaturists
Living people
People from North Vancouver